The 3rd Los Angeles Film Critics Association Awards, honoring the best in film for 1977, were announced on 19 December 1977 and given on 10 January 1978.

Winners
Best Picture:
Star Wars
Best Director:
Herbert Ross – The Turning Point
Best Actor:
Richard Dreyfuss – The Goodbye Girl
Best Actress:
Shelley Duvall – 3 Women
Best Supporting Actor:
Jason Robards – Julia
Best Supporting Actress:
Vanessa Redgrave – Julia
Best Screenplay:
Woody Allen and Marshall Brickman – Annie Hall
Best Cinematography:
Douglas Slocombe – Julia
Best Music Score:
John Williams – Star Wars
Best Foreign Film:
That Obscure Object of Desire (Cet obscur objet du désir) • France/Spain
New Generation Award:
Joan Micklin Silver
Career Achievement Award:
King Vidor
Special Citation:
Charles Gary Allison, for his initiative in organizing the production of Fraternity Row and thus opening a gateway into professional film production for advanced cinema students.
Barbara Kopple – Harlan County, U.S.A.

References

External links
3rd Annual Los Angeles Film Critics Association Awards

1977
Los Angeles Film Critics Association Awards
Los Angeles Film Critics Association Awards
Los Angeles Film Critics Association Awards
Los Angeles Film Critics Association Awards
Los Angeles Film Critics Association Awards